The Sunday Times Rich List 2019 is the 31st annual survey of the wealthiest people resident in the United Kingdom, published by The Sunday Times on 12 May 2019.

The List was edited by Robert Watts who succeeded long-term compiler Philip Beresford in 2017.

The List was previewed in the previous week's Sunday Times and widely reported by other media.

Top 15 fortunes

See also 
 Forbes list of billionaires

References

External links 
 Sunday Times Rich List

Sunday Times Rich List
2019 in the United Kingdom